Baiveriyaa is a 2016 Maldivian comedy film written and directed by Yoosuf Shafeeu. Produced by Niuma Mohamed and Ismail Shafeeq under Envision Entertainment, the film stars Yoosuf Shafeeu, Sheela Najeeb, Ahmed Azmeel, Maleeha Waheed and Ahmed Saeed in pivotal roles. The film was released on 14 December 2016. The film revolves around an aspiring actress who flees from her family to pursue a career in the film industry and the suspicions and  confusions that arise.

Cast 
 Yoosuf Shafeeu as Werash
 Sheela Najeeb as Riyasha
 Ahmed Azmeel as Yanish
 Maleeha Waheed as Iwrisha
 Ahmed Saeed as Janu
 Nashidha Mohamed as Noora
 Ahmed Sunie as Wafir
 Mohamed Faisal as Bassam
 Hussain Shibau as Nasir
 Ahmed Rifau
 Maisha Ahmed
 Hussain Shadyaan Hassan
 Fathimath Azifa

Release
Producer Ismail Shafeeq conceptualised the film in 2013 and shared it with Yoosuf Shafeeu who wrote the screenplay, then directed, starred in, and edited the film. The film was announced on 6 June 2016. The film was released on 14 December 2016. Upon release the film was positively received by critics. Nazim Hassan of Avas applauded the comical timing of the characters and picked the arguments between Shafeeu and Najeeb as the highlight of the film. Hassan was dissatisfied with the length of the film though he praised the "twist at the end" of the film.

References

2016 films
2016 comedy films
Maldivian comedy films
Films directed by Yoosuf Shafeeu
Dhivehi-language films